South Dakota Highway 43 (SD 43) is a  state highway that exists entirely in the southern part of Gregory County in the southern part of the U.S. state of South Dakota. It begins as an extension of Nebraska Highway 11 (N-11) at the Nebraska state line south of Fairfax. It travels northwest to an intersection with U.S. Route 18 (US 18) south-southwest of the town.

Route description
SD 43 begins at the Nebraska state line as a continuation of N-11. It travels northwest for just over  before meeting its northern terminus at an intersection with US 18. The highway does not travel through any populated areas, but rather serves as a connector route between N-11 and US 18.

History

The first road designated as SD 43 was around 1932, in Platte. It traveled east before heading south to travel through Geddes, ending at US 18 west of Lake Andes. This segment, previously part of SD 45, was given a separate number when SD 45 was rerouted south from Platte. By 1935, it was extended to the north and west, assuming the routing of SD 47 when the latter highway was relocated west of the Missouri River; its northern terminus was at the intersection of US 16 in Pukwana (in Brule County). The number was removed around 1940, when SD 50 was extended northwest from its previous terminus near Ravinia (east of Lake Andes).

The present day SD 43 was initially a segment of US 281. The old alignment was unnumbered until 1976, when it given its current assignment.

Major intersections

References

External links
South Dakota Highways Page: Highways 31-60

043
Transportation in Gregory County, South Dakota
U.S. Route 281